Sharifova is a feminine surname, found among traditionally Muslim ethnic groups in the former Soviet Union. The masculine counterpart surname is Sharifov. The name meaning is "daughter of the Sharif" (from "Sharif" and the Slavic name suffix "-ova"). People with this surname include:
 Aytaj Sharifova (born 1997), Azerbaijani footballer
 Firangiz Sharifova (1924–2014), Azerbaijani actress

Azerbaijani-language surnames
Slavic-language female forms of surnames